Hawick railway station served the town of Hawick, Scottish Borders, Scotland from 1849 to 1969 on the Waverley Route.

History 
The first station opened on 1 November 1849 as a terminus of the line from Edinburgh. It was located just to the north of North Bridge on Dovemount Place. There was no public celebration in Hawick, due to an outbreak of Cholera in the town.

The second station was built close to the first station for the through line southwards and opened on 1 July 1862 by the North British Railway. The station was situated on the north side of Mansfield Road. The goods yard had a large stone goods shed and two sidings running through it. On the north side of the goods shed were a further five sidings and a large dock. A private siding served Mansfield Gas Works. 

In 1914 the North British Railway company implemented some improvements at the station. A new booking hall was erected and subways constructed at the south end of the platform, allowing the removal of an old overhead footbridge. There was an electric hoist for baggage at the north end of the station. The signal box was raised in height and enlarged, and the platform canopies were extended. One of the most striking improvements was the installation of high-pressure incandescent gas-lighting. This was the first such installation in Scotland. Altogether 175 separate lamps varying from 800 to 1000 candle-power were installed. The cost of the alterations was around £5,000 . The contractor was J. Marshall and Son of Hawick.  

On 4 January 1969, two days before its closure to passengers, a group of protesters gathered on the platform, with a black coffin addressed to Richard Marsh, who was the Minister of Transport at the time. It was sent south by train. The last passenger service was a sleeper service from Edinburgh Waverley to London St Pancras. A lot of local people gathered to say farewell when it reached Hawick at 23:27. The station closed to goods traffic on 28 April 1969.

Hawick Engine Shed 
Hawick Engine Shed opened on 1 November 1849 and had a depot code of 64C. By 1948, the shed had an allocation of 26 locomotives. The shed closed on 3 January 1966, although it was still used as a booking-on point for train crews until the closure of the line.

Stationmasters

Mr. Richards ca. 1858 ca. 1859
William Waldie ca. 1863 - 1870
John McDonald ca. 1871
Robert White 1874 - 1905
Alexander Miller 1905 - 1915 (formerly station master at Polmont, afterwards station master at Kirkcaldy)
Bailie James Hogg 1915 - 1931 (formerly station master at Polmont)
Alexander Aitkinhead 1931 - 1942 (formerly station master at Bo’ness, West Lothian)
T. Lawrence from 1942 (formerly station master at St Boswells)
George Bell 1944 - 1951 (formerly station master at Eskbank, afterwards station master at Dundee Tay Bridge, Dundee West and Magdalen Green)
Eric D. Parsons 1951 - 1954 (formerly station master at Batley, Yorkshire)
Alexander Baxter from 1954  (formerly station master at Montrose)

References

External links 

Disused railway stations in the Scottish Borders
Railway stations in Great Britain opened in 1849
Railway stations in Great Britain closed in 1862
Railway stations in Great Britain opened in 1862
Railway stations in Great Britain closed in 1969
Beeching closures in Scotland
Former North British Railway stations
Hawick
1862 establishments in Scotland
1969 disestablishments in Scotland